Mędzisko is a settlement in the administrative district of Gmina Obrzycko, within Szamotuły County, Greater Poland Voivodeship, in west-central Poland.

During the German occupation of Poland (World War II), Mędzisko was the site of a massacre of around 420 Poles from the region, including nearby towns of Czarnków, Międzychód, Pniewy, Szamotuły and Wronki, carried out by the Germans throughout October–December 1939 as part of the genocidal Intelligenzaktion campaign. In 1944, the Germans burned the bodies of the victims in attempt to cover up the crime.

References

Villages in Szamotuły County
Massacres of Poles
Nazi war crimes in Poland